Nemapogon mesoplaca is a moth of the family Tineidae. It is found in India.

References

http://animaldiversity.org/accounts/Nemapogon_mesoplaca/classification/

Moths described in 1919
Nemapogoninae